Oldřich Buďárek (born 11 March 1915, date of death unknown) was a Czech ski jumper. He competed in the individual event at the 1936 Winter Olympics.

References

1915 births
Year of death missing
Czech male ski jumpers
Olympic ski jumpers of Czechoslovakia
Ski jumpers at the 1936 Winter Olympics
Place of birth missing